Bythiospeum diaphanum is a species of very small freshwater snails that have an operculum, aquatic gastropod mollusks in the family Hydrobiidae.

This species is endemic to France and Switzerland.

References

Hydrobiidae
Bythiospeum
Gastropods described in 1831
Taxonomy articles created by Polbot